P. giganteum may refer to:
 
 Piptostigma giganteum, a plant species endemic to Nigeria
 Plasmodium giganteum, a parasite species

See also
 Giganteum